Long March Launch Vehicle Technology Co. Ltd. is an aerospace company under China Aerospace Science and Technology Corporation. It is based in and mostly run in Beijing.

External links
 http://www.rocketstock.com.cn/EnglishWeb

Companies based in Beijing
Aerospace companies of China
Companies listed on the Shanghai Stock Exchange
Government-owned companies of China